Blastodacna erebopis is a moth in the family Elachistidae. It is found on Java.

The larvae feed on Terminalia edulis.

References

Moths described in 1934
Blastodacna
Moths of Indonesia
Taxa named by Edward Meyrick